In November 2019, a consortium of around 15 local grassroots organizations called the FTP coalition began a series of disruptive protests in New York City against a crackdown on fare evasion and an increased police presence in the city's transit system. According to the coalition organizers, "FTP stands for many things, including 'Feed the People' and 'For the People', but stands for '' when it comes to subway protests."

The FTP coalition has thus far held four protests:
 November 4, 2019
 November 22, 2019
 January 31, 2020
June 4, 2020

Background
In June 2019, a plan was announced by then Governor Andrew Cuomo that the MTA would locate 500 NYPD and MTA Bridge and Tunnel officers to combat fare evasion after recent reports from the agency estimated that the system had lost approximately $215 million due to unpaid fares. Officers would begin to appear at select train stations and bus stops that autumn. According to The Guardian, "The coalition was created in response to incidents that happened one weekend in October and went viral on social media, including a video that showed police drawing their guns and storming a subway car." The first FTP protest was hosted the week after one of the incidents, where NYPD officers fought a group of teenagers on a subway platform.

References

2019 in New York City
2019 protests
2020 in New York City
2020 protests
New York City Subway fare payment
November 2019 events in the United States
January 2020 events in the United States
Protests in New York (state)